The Herbert P. Broida Prize is awarded every two years by the American Physical Society for outstanding work for experimental advances in the field of atomic and molecular spectroscopy or 
chemical physics. The prize was established in 1979 and is named after the physicist . The winner receives $5000 and travel expenses to the award ceremony.

Winners 

 1980: Robert W. Field
 1981: William Carl Lineberger
 1983: Theodor W. Hänsch
 1985: 
 1987: Steven Chu
 1989: Stephen Leone
 1991: David E. Pritchard
 1993: Curt Wittig
 1995: Ahmed Zewail
 1997: William Happer
 1999: 
 2001: , Paul Houston
 2003: George W. Flynn
 2005: Hanna Reisler
 2007: 
 2009: 
 2011: Warren S. Warren
 2013: Daniel M. Neumark
 2015: Michael Ashfold
 2017: 
 2019: Marsha I. Lester
 2021: John M. Doyle
 2023: Lai-Sheng Wang

Source:

See also
 List of physics awards

References 

Awards of the American Physical Society